This is a list of the German Media Control GfK International Top100 Singles Chart number-ones of 1986.

See also
List of number-one hits (Germany)

Notes

References

 German Singles Chart Archives from 1956
 Media Control Chart Archives from 1960

1986 in Germany
1986 record charts
1986